Muhammara ( "reddened") or mhammara is a spicy dip made of walnuts, red bell peppers, pomegranate molasses, and breadcrumbs. It is associated with Aleppo, but can also be found in Turkey, especially in southeastern regions, where Arab dishes are more common in the local cuisine because of the Syrian cultural influence, as well as in Western Armenian cuisine. In Turkey, muhammara is referred to as acuka and is served as part of the mezze platter appetizer course.

Ingredients
The principal ingredients are usually fresh or dried peppers, usually Aleppo pepper, ground walnuts, breadcrumbs, and olive oil.  It may also contain garlic, salt, lemon juice, pomegranate molasses, and sometimes spices (e.g. cumin).  It may be garnished with mint leaves or parsley.

Usage
Muhammara is eaten as a dip with bread, as a spread for toast, and as a sauce for kebabs, grilled meats, and fish.

See also
 Ajika, a dip in Caucasian cuisine, based on a boiled preparation of hot red peppers, garlic, herbs and spices
 Ajvar, a condiment made principally from roasted peppers, eggplants, and sunflower oil or olive oil that is popular in Croatia, Bosnia, Serbia, and other Balkan cuisines
 Biber salçası, a hot or sweet pepper paste in Turkish cuisine
 Harissa, a hot chili pepper paste in Maghreb cuisine
 Sahawiq, a hot sauce in Middle Eastern cuisine, made from fresh hot peppers seasoned with coriander, garlic and various spices
 List of dips
 List of sauces

References

Dips (food)
Levantine cuisine
Meze
Spicy foods
Vegan cuisine
Turkish vegetarian cuisine